The Kiss Network is a network of radio stations in the United Kingdom, owned by Bauer Media Audio UK, focusing on the 15-34 age group.

According to RAJAR, the network broadcasts to a combined weekly audience of 4.2 million with a listening share of 2.2% as of December 2022.

Stations
Radio:

Television:

Former stations

See also
Kiss Does... Rave

References

External links
KISS at Bauer's Planet Radio
 - RadioToday article from 2019 on the initial suite of Kiss, Kerrang! and Heat siblings (the Heat spinoffs have since ceased)

 
Bauer Radio
British radio networks